Huilong is a town of Zhongjiang County in northeastern Sichuan province, China, situated  east-southeast of the county seat and  southeast of Deyang as the crow flies. , it has two residential communities (社区) and 29 villages under its administration.

See also 
 List of township-level divisions of Sichuan

References 

Towns in Sichuan
Deyang